Pittsfield Municipal Airport may refer to:

 Pittsfield Municipal Airport (Maine) in Pittsfield, Maine, United States
 Pittsfield Municipal Airport (Massachusetts) in Pittsfield, Massachusetts, United States